Hans Boudewijn Binkhorst  (17 September 1942 – 16 July 2021) was a Dutch sailor who represented his country at the 1968 Summer Olympics in Acapulco. Binkhorst, on the Dutch Finn, took the 19th place. Since in 1980 The  Netherlands did boycott the Moscow Olympic Games Binkhorst in the Star represented his National Olympic Committee under the Dutch NOC flag . With crew member Kobus Vandenberg. They took 6th place. The last Olympic appearance of Binkhorst was during the 1984 Olympics again in the Star and this time with crew Willem van Walt Meijer. They took 8th place.

Controversies
1980: Several countries did boycott the 1980 Summer Olympics, others like France did not go since they found the competition devalued. As result only half of the expected fleet was present during the Olympic regattas.
1982: Just before the start of the 1982 Star World Championship in Medemblik Binkhorst took, by legal procedure, possession of five valuable prizes of the Star Class Organisation (ISCYRA). This was the result of a conflict between Binkhorst (and a German boatbuilder) and the ISCYRA about the creation of an unsinkable Star. One outcome was that the team of Binkhorst and Willem van Walt Meijer did not start at the Worlds and missed an opportunity to qualify for the Olympics.

Binkhorst became European champion Finn in 1971 and 2nd at the World championship Finn in 1975. Both after long periods of not participating because of professional obligations.

Personal life and death
Binkhorst studied Medicine at the Groningen University. Later he worked as Physician, e.g. at the Sportmedisch Adviescentrum, Amersfoort. He died in Breskens on 16 July 2021, at the age of 78.

References

Sources
 
 
 
 
 
 
 
 
 
 
 
 
 
 
 
 
 
 
 
 
 
 
 
 
 
 
 
 
 
 

 
 
 
 
 
 

1942 births
2021 deaths
People from Oegstgeest
Dutch male sailors (sport)
Sailors at the 1968 Summer Olympics – Finn
Sailors at the 1980 Summer Olympics – Star
Sailors at the 1984 Summer Olympics – Star
Olympic sailors of the Netherlands
Sportspeople from South Holland